Parapercis multiplicata, the redbarred sandperch, is a fish species in the sandperch family, Pinguipedidae. It is found Western Pacific, from southern Japan to the Great Barrier Reef off of Australia, east to Pitcairn Island, and west to Western Australia.

References

Randall, J.E., G.R. Allen and R.C. Steene, 1990. Fishes of the Great Barrier Reef and Coral Sea. University of Hawaii Press, Honolulu, Hawaii. 506 p.

Pinguipedidae
Taxa named by John Ernest Randall
Fish described in 1984